Justin Bradley Davies (born 13 February 1986) is a New Zealand rugby union player. His position is Prop. Originally coming from Moerewa, he plays club rugby for Hikurangi Rugby Club.

References

New Zealand rugby union players
Rugby union props
1986 births
Living people
Northland rugby union players
Rugby union players from the Northland Region